Smithy Bridge is a suburb of Littleborough in the Metropolitan Borough of Rochdale, Greater Manchester, England. Hollingworth Lake Country Park is close by. It also has a link to the Rochdale Canal and has its own railway station. It was once a route on the packhorse trip through to Yorkshire.

Smithy Bridge was formerly a part of Butterworth.

See also

Listed buildings in Littleborough, Greater Manchester

References

Areas of the Metropolitan Borough of Rochdale
Villages in Greater Manchester
Littleborough, Greater Manchester